Brzegi Dolne  ( Berehy Dolishni) is a village in the administrative district of Gmina Ustrzyki Dolne, within Bieszczady County, Subcarpathian Voivodeship, in south-eastern Poland.

The village was established in 1532 on Vlach law. In 1788 German Lutheran colonists settled on the fields of the village to form Siegenthal colony.

References

Villages in Bieszczady County